Mthokozisi Evans Dube (born 10 September 1992) is a South African soccer player who plays for Lamontville Golden Arrows.

References

1992 births
Living people
South African soccer players
Sportspeople from Germiston
Soccer players from Gauteng
Association football defenders
Roses United F.C. players
Royal Eagles F.C. players
Bloemfontein Celtic F.C. players
Orlando Pirates F.C. players
Lamontville Golden Arrows F.C. players
South African Premier Division players
National First Division players